I Ching or Yijing is a Chinese classic text.

I Ching may also refer to:

 I Ching (monk) (635–713), a Tang Dynasty Buddhist monk
 I Ching (comics), fictional, blind martial artist published by DC Comics
 I Ching (band), band from London
 I Ching divination, cleromancy method using I Ching

See also
Yijing (disambiguation)